Elk Township is a township in Stoddard County, in the U.S. state of Missouri.

Elk Township was erected in 1868, taking its name from Elk Creek.

References

Townships in Missouri
Townships in Stoddard County, Missouri
1868 establishments in Missouri